The 2021 Credit Karma Money 250 was the 18th stock car race of the 2021 NASCAR Xfinity Series season, and the inaugural running of the event, when NASCAR decided to return to Atlanta for two races a year instead of the previous one. The race was held on Saturday, July 10, 2021 in Hampton, Georgia at Atlanta Motor Speedway, a  permanent asphalt quad-oval intermediate speedway. The race was extended to 164 laps from the scheduled 163 due to a NASCAR overtime finish. In a historic 102nd and final win in the NASCAR Xfinity Series, Kyle Busch of Joe Gibbs Racing would win his last ever race in the series, after Busch had promised to focus more on managing his own race team, and developing the No. 54 car. Jeb Burton of Kaulig Racing and Noah Gragson of JR Motorsports would score the rest of the podium positions, taking 2nd and 3rd, respectively.

Background 
Atlanta Motor Speedway (formerly Atlanta International Raceway) is a track in Hampton, Georgia, 20 miles (32 km) south of Atlanta. It is a 1.54-mile (2.48 km) quad-oval track with a seating capacity of 111,000. It opened in 1960 as a 1.5-mile (2.4 km) standard oval. In 1994, 46 condominiums were built over the northeastern side of the track. In 1997, to standardize the track with Speedway Motorsports' other two 1.5-mile (2.4 km) ovals, the entire track was almost completely rebuilt. The frontstretch and backstretch were swapped, and the configuration of the track was changed from oval to quad-oval. The project made the track one of the fastest on the NASCAR circuit.

Entry list

Starting lineup 
The starting lineup for the race was decided by a formula based on the previous race, the 2021 Henry 180. As a result, Kyle Busch of Joe Gibbs Racing would win the pole.

Race results 
Stage 1 Laps: 40

Stage 2 Laps: 40

Stage 3 Laps: 84

References 

2021 NASCAR Xfinity Series
NASCAR races at Atlanta Motor Speedway
Credit Karma Money 250
Credit Karma Money 250